A scolopidium (historically, scolopophore) is the fundamental unit of a mechanoreceptor organ in insects. It is a composition of three cells: a scolopale cap cell which caps the scolopale cell, and a bipolar sensory nerve cell.

The general term of these overall sense organs is the chordotonal organs, with the scolopidia usually lying just under the exoskeleton. Scolopidia may be located within:

 the subgenual organ: located in the lower part of the legs; primarily senses vibrations in underlying substrate
 the crista acustica: collection of individually tuned scolopidia able to discriminate frequencies 
 Johnston's organ: located in the antennae; senses motion of an antenna relative to the insect's body

There are many types of scolopidia, depending on the sense organ in which they belong.

Mechanosensation

Function 
Scolopidia are sensitive to mechanical disturbances, such as sound (vibrations of the air) or substrate vibrations (vibrations of surrounding solid material), depending on the structure of the overall sense organ in which they reside. While many species using mechanoreceptors to transduce and locate sources of sound, functions such as detecting gravitational forces or airflow have also been demonstrated. Airflow direction detection by mechanoreceptors appears to be key in the navigational behavior of flying insects, particularly in environments with slow or absent visual feedback.

A single individual may possess scolopidia that are capable of sensing a range of low to high frequencies. This enables a single organ to serve multiple functions, ranging from gravity sensing to acoustic sensing.

Physiology 
Scolopidia ultimately convert mechanical vibration into a nerve impulse, which is sent on to higher ganglion where the information is combined and/or processed into a resultant behavior. Mechanosensory information received by scolopidia is typically transduced faster than visual feedback, due to the physical mechanism of activating a neural impulse. Sensory neurons coupled to scolopidia are also of larger diameter, increasing conduction rate.

In some moths, honeybees, and fruit flies, projections from scolopidia in Johnston's organs project directly to regions in the brain.

Types of scolopidia 
Classification and nomenclature of cells is not always uniform.

Scolopidia may be classified by their location:

 subintegumental: distal end (cap end) is contained within the body wall of the insect
 integumental: distal end is free, exterior to the insect

Classification may also be performed based on the ciliary processes of the cells:

 ciliary structures expand and constrict near the attachment cell
 ciliary structures display consistent expansion throughout
 one cilium expands distally, while the other two are unmodified

Scolopidia sensory cells may also be grouped by structure, location, and number of sensory cells (e.g. two, or three).

Locations 
Integumental scolopidia are found in the subgenual organ (also known as  the supratympanal organ), subintegumental scolopidia are found in the crista acustica and the intermediate organ.

The subgenual organ ('organ below the knee') is found in all insects legs, and the probably an evolutionary artifact of prior insect body-types which used their legs to detect vibrations from the substrate (viz., treehoppers).  The intermediate organ and the crista acustica, on the other hand, are only found where there is a tympanum, such as on the front legs of insects.

Number diversity 
Swarming insects must detect the wing sounds of conspecifics in order to identify potential mates, and do so by using vibrations present in the air. The antennal Johnston's organ in swarming Diptera (e.g. midges and mosquitos) may contain tens of thousands of scolopophorous sense cells, which are grouped by two's or three's into individual scolopidia. The high number of scolopidia in Johnston's organ provides an evolutionary advantage in acoustically identifying and locating mates.

Non-swarming insects accordingly possess less scolopidia. Certain Hemiptera and Diptera may possess as few as 25 scolopidia.

See also
 Chordotonal organ
 Crista acustica
Subgenual organ
Johnston's organ
Mechanosensation

References

 The insects: structure and function, R. F. Chapman, Reginald Frederick Chapman.

Insect anatomy